Trachycladus is a genus of sea sponge belonging to the family Trachycladidae.

Species
Species in this genus include:
Trachycladus cervicornis Burton, 1959
Trachycladus laevispirulifer Carter, 1879
Trachycladus minax (Topsent, 1888)
Trachycladus spinispirulifer (Carter, 1879)
Trachycladus stylifer Dendy, 1924
Trachycladus tethyoides Burton, 1959

References 

Hadromerida
Taxa named by Henry John Carter